Charles Emmanuel II; 20 June 1634 – 12 June 1675) was Duke of Savoy from 1638 to 1675 and under regency of his mother Christine of France until 1648. He was also Marquis of Saluzzo, Count of Aosta, Geneva, Moriana and Nice, as well as claimant king of Cyprus, Jerusalem and Armenia. At his death in 1675 his second wife Marie Jeanne Baptiste of Savoy-Nemours acted as regent for their nine-year-old son.

Biography
He was born in Turin to Victor Amadeus I, Duke of Savoy, and Christine of France. His maternal grandparents were Henry IV of France and his second wife Marie de' Medici. In 1638 at the death of his older brother Francis Hyacinth, Duke of Savoy, Charles Emmanuel succeeded to the duchy of Savoy at the age of 4. His mother governed in his place, and even after reaching adulthood in 1648, he invited her to continue to rule. Charles Emmanuel continued a life of pleasure, far away from the affairs of state.

He became notorious for his persecution of the Vaudois (Waldensians) culminating in the massacre of 1655, known as Piedmontese Easter. The massacre was so brutal that it prompted the English poet John Milton to write the sonnet On the Late Massacre in Piedmont. Oliver Cromwell, Lord Protector, called for a general fast in England and proposed to send the British Navy if the massacre was not stopped while gathering funds for helping the Waldensians. Sir Samuel Morland was commissioned with that task. He later wrote The History of the Evangelical Churches of the Valleys of Piemont (1658). The 1655 massacre was only the beginning of a series of conflicts, the Savoyard–Waldensian wars (1655–1690), that saw Waldensian rebels use guerrilla warfare tactics against ducal military campaigns to enforce Roman Catholicism upon the entire population.

Only after the death of his mother in 1663, did he really assume power. He was not successful in gaining a passage to the sea at the expense of Genoa (Second Genoese–Savoyard War, 1672–1673), and had difficulties in retaining the influence of his powerful neighbour France.

But he greatly improved commerce and wealth in the Duchy, developing the port of Nice and building a road through the Alps towards France. He also reformed the army, which until then was mostly composed of mercenaries: he formed instead five Piedmontese regiments and recreated cavalry, as well as introducing uniforms. He also restored fortifications. He constructed many beautiful buildings in Turin, for instance the Palazzo Reale.

He died on 12 June 1675, leaving his second wife as regent for his son.  He is buried at Turin Cathedral.

Marriages and issue

Charles Emmanuel first met Marie Jeanne of Savoy in 1659 and fell in love with her.  However, his mother disagreed with the pairing, and encouraged him to marry Françoise Madeleine d'Orléans, daughter of his maternal uncle Gaston, Duke of Orléans, the younger brother of his mother Christine Marie.  They were married 3 April 1663.  The couple had no issue.  His mother died at the end of 1663, and his first wife died at the start of 1664.  This left him free to get married on 20 May 1665 to Marie Jeanne of Savoy.  They had one son:
Victor Amadeus II of Sardinia, future King of Sicily and later Sardinia; married Anne Marie d'Orléans and had issue; had illegitimate issue also; married Anna Canalis di Cumiana in a morganatic marriage
Charles Emmanuel II also recognized five of his illegitimate children by three different mistresses.

Ancestors

References

(alleanza monarchica, Italian)

|-

1634 births
1675 deaths
17th-century Dukes of Savoy
Nobility from Turin
Princes of Savoy
Claimant Kings of Jerusalem
Counts of Aosta
Counts of Geneva
Modern child monarchs
Burials at Turin Cathedral